Tatjana (Malek) Maria and Kristina Mladenovic were the defending champions, but decided not to participate this year.

Alla Kudryavtseva and Anastasia Rodionova won the title, defeating Andrea Hlaváčková and Lucie Hradecká 6–4, 6–3 in the final.

Seeds

Draw

References
Main Draw

Challenge Bell
Tournoi de Québec
Can